Bioactive may refer to: 

Biological activity, the effect of a drug or compound on living matter
Bioactive compounds, a compound that has an effect on a living organism, tissue /cell
Bioactive glass,a group of surface reactive glass-ceramic biomaterials used as implanted devices in the human body to repair and replace diseased or damaged bones
Bioactive paper, a paper-based sensor that can identify various contaminants in food and water
Bioactive terrarium, a terrarium/vivarium which includes a population of invertebrates and microbes to process animal waste